The name Parma has been used for two tropical cyclones in the Northwest Pacific Ocean. The name was contributed by Macau, and refers to a type of food there.

 Typhoon Parma (2003) (T0318, 21W) – long lived typhoon that remained over the open ocean
 Typhoon Parma (2009) (T0917, 19W, Pepeng) – traversed the Northern Philippines, made landfall on the island of Hainan, China, and then in Vietnam

The name Parma was retired after the 2009 typhoon season, and replaced by In-fa in the 2015 season.

References 

Pacific typhoon set index articles